Nautilus-class submarine may refer to:
 Nautilus-class submarine (1913), an Italian class of submarines including the Italian submarine Nereide (1913)
 Nautilus-class submarine (1914), a single-build class of British Royal Navy diesel-electric propulsion submarines
 Nautilus-class submarine (1954), a single-build class of United States Navy nuclear-powered submarines

See also
HMS Nautilus
USS Nautilus
List of ships named Nautilus